Tiësto's In Search of Sunrise 5 Asia Tour was a 2006 tour by Dutch DJ and record producer Tiësto to promote his compilation album In Search of Sunrise 5: Los Angeles.

During the Winter Music Conference, the launch party at "Mansion", South Beach, Miami, on March 26 Tiësto presented his DJ Mix compilation In Search of Sunrise 5: Los Angeles. The tour began with a five-hour set at the international grand prix featured at the Renault F1 Pit on the night of March 18 in Kuala Lumpur, Malaysia. The tour was followed 48 hours later at Tokyo's Studio Coast also known as "ageHa" in Shin Kiba on the eve of the Spring Equinox Holiday. The ageHa Arena was arranged with 38 speakers settled in "Daytona fashion" around a 2,500 capacity main room, he used six turntables and four CDJ ageHa DJ booth, he was also supported by Japanese deejay Yoda on March 20. The third concert was held in the Philippine International Convention Center (PICC) at the Philippines from 9:00 p.m. to 6:00 a.m.

Tour dates

See also
 In Search of Sunrise (series)
 In Search of Sunrise 5: Los Angeles

References

2006 concert tours
Tiësto concert tours